John E. Amoore (1930–1998) was a British biochemist who first proposed the stereochemical theory for olfaction.

Bibliography
Molecular Basis of Odor John E. Amoore, Published 1970, Thomas 
How Smells Shape Up John E. Amoore, Published 1977, American Chemical Society

References

British biochemists
1930 births
1998 deaths